Payariq (formerly mekishovka) is a city in Samarqand Region, Uzbekistan. It is the capital of Payariq District. It is located along the mountains of Nurota. Nearest railroad station - Ulugbek(40 km). The town's population was 7,949 people in 1989, and 10,600 in 2016.

References

Populated places in Samarqand Region
Cities in Uzbekistan